Maria Sharapova was the defending champion, and successfully defended her title, beating Li Na in the final, 6–4, 6–3.

Seeds
The top four seeds receive a bye into the second round.

Draw

Finals

Top half

Bottom half

Qualifying

Seeds

Qualifiers

Draw

First qualifier

Second qualifier

Third qualifier

Fourth qualifier

External links
 Main draw
 Qualifying draw

Porsche Tennis Grand Prix Singles
2013 Women's Singles